Collusion is a deceitful agreement or secret cooperation between two or more parties to limit open competition by deceiving, misleading or defrauding others of their legal right. Collusion is not always considered illegal. It can be used to attain objectives forbidden by law; for example, by defrauding or gaining an unfair market advantage. It is an agreement among firms or individuals to divide a market, set prices, limit production or limit opportunities.
It can involve "unions, wage fixing, kickbacks, or misrepresenting the independence of the relationship between the colluding parties".  In legal terms, all acts effected  by collusion are considered void.

Definition 
In the study of economics and market competition, collusion takes place within an industry when rival companies cooperate for their mutual benefit. Conspiracy usually involves an agreement between two or more sellers to take action to suppress competition between sellers in the market. Because competition among sellers can provide consumers with low prices, conspiracy agreements increase the price consumers pay for the goods. Because of this harm to consumers, it is against antitrust laws to fix prices by agreement between producers, so participants must keep it a secret. Collusion often takes place within an oligopoly market structure, where there are few firms and agreements that have significant impacts on the entire market or industry. To differentiate from a cartel, collusive agreements between parties may not be explicit; however, the implications of cartels and collusion are the same.

Under competition law, there is an essential distinction between direct and covert collusion. Direct collusion generally refers to a group of companies communicating directly with each other, usually to coordinate and monitor their actions, to cooperate through pricing, market allocation, sales quotas, etc. By contrast, tacit collusion is where companies coordinate and monitor their behaviour without this direct communication. This is generally not considered illegal, so companies guilty of tacit conspiracy should face no penalties, even though their actions would have a similar economic impact as explicit conspiracy. Collusion results from less competition through mutual understanding, where competitors can independently set prices and market share. A core principle of antitrust policy is that companies must not communicate with each other. Even if conversations between multiple companies are illegal but not enforceable, the incentives to comply with collusive agreements are the same with and without communication. It is against competition law for companies to have explicit conversations in private. If evidence of conversations is accidentally left behind, it will become the most critical and conclusive evidence in antitrust litigation. Even without communication, businesses can coordinate prices by observation, but from a legal standpoint, this tacit handling leaves no evidence. Most companies cooperate through invisible collusion, so whether companies communicate is at the core of antitrust policy.

Covert collusion is known as tacit collusion and is considered legal. Adam Smith in The Wealth of Nations explains that since the masters (business owners) are fewer in number, it is easier to collude to serve common interests among those involved, such as maintaining low wages, whilst it is difficult for the labour to coordinate to protect their interests due to their vast numbers. Hence, business owners have a bigger advantage over the working class. Nevertheless, according to Adam Smith, the public rarely hears about coordination and collaborations that occur between business owners as it takes place in informal settings. Some forms of explicit collusion are not considered impactful enough on an individual basis to be considered illegal, such as that which occurred by the social media group WallStreetBets in the GameStop short squeeze.

Base model of (Price) Collusion
For a cartel to work successfully, it must:

 coordinate on the conspiracy agreement.
(Bargaining, explicit or implicit communication)
 Monitor compliance.
 Punish non-compliance.
 Control the expansion of non-cartel supply.
 Avoid inspection by customers and competition authorities.

Regarding stability within the cartel:
 Collusion on high prices means that members have an incentive to deviate.
 In a one-off situation, high prices are not sustainable.
 Requires long-term vision and repeated interactions.
 Companies need to choose between two approaches：
 Insist on collusion agreements (now) and promote cooperation (future).
 Turn away from the alliance (now) and face punishment (future).
 Two factors influence this choice: (1) deviations must be detectable (2) penalties for deviations must have a significant effect.
 Collusion is illegal, contracts between cartels establishing collusion are not protected by law, cannot be enforced by courts, and must have other forms of punishment

Variations 
 

 

 

 

 

Suppose this market has  firms. If and only if the profit of choosing to deviate is greater than that of sticking to collude, i.e.
  (Companies have no incentive to deviate unilaterally)
 Therefore, the cartel alliance will be stable when  is the case, i.e. the firm has no incentive to deviate unilaterally. So as the number of firms increases, the more difficult it is for The Cartel to maintain stability.
As the number of firms in the market increases, so does the factor of the minimum discount required for collusion to succeed.

According to neoclassical price-determination theory and game theory, the independence of suppliers forces prices to their minimum, increasing efficiency and decreasing the price-determining ability of each firm.  However if all firms collude to increase prices, loss of sales will be minimized, as consumers lack choices at lower prices and must decide between what is available. This benefits the colluding firms, as they generate more sales at the cost of efficiency to society. However, depending on the assumptions made in the theoretical model on the information available to all firms, there are some outcomes, based on Cooperative Game Theory, where collusion may have higher efficiency than if firms did not collude.

One variation of this traditional theory is the theory of kinked demand. Firms face a kinked demand curve if, when one firm decreases its price, other firms are expected to follow suit to maintain sales. When one firm increases its price, its rivals are unlikely to follow, as they would lose the sales gains they would otherwise receive by holding prices at the previous level.  Kinked demand potentially fosters supra-competitive prices because any one firm would receive a reduced benefit from cutting price, as opposed to the benefits accruing under neoclassical theory and certain game-theoretic models such as Bertrand competition.

Collusion may also occur in auction markets, where independent firms coordinate their bids (bid rigging).

Deviation 

Actions that generate sufficient returns in the future are important to every company, and the probability of continued interaction and the company discount factor must be high enough. The sustainability of cooperation between companies also depends on the threat of punishment, which is also a matter of credibility. Firms that deviate from cooperative pricing will use MMC in each market. MMC increases the loss of deviation, and incremental loss is more important than incremental gain when the firm's objective function is concave. Therefore, the purpose of MMC is to strengthen corporate compliance or inhibit deviant collusion.

The principle of collusion: firms give up deviation gains in the short term in exchange for continued collusion in the future.
 Collusion occurs when companies place more emphasis on future profits
 Collusion is easier to sustain when the choice deviates from the maximum profit to be gained is lower (i.e. the penalty profit is lower) and the penalty is greater.
 Future collusive profits − future punishment profits ≥ current deviation profits − current collusive profits-collusion can sustain.

Scholars in economics and management have tried to identify factors explaining why some firms are more or less likely to be involved in collusion. Some have noted the role of the regulatory environment and the existence of leniency programs.

Indicators 
Practices that suggest possible collusion may include one or more actions such as:

 Uniform prices and setting of an unjustified high or an unjustified low price
 Kickbacks and blanket referral agreements between competing businesses
 Dividing territories and market allocation
 Tying agreements and anticompetitive Product bundling (although, not all product bundling is anticompetitive)
 Refusal to deal and Exclusive dealing
 Dumping (pricing policy)
 Vertical restraints
 Horizontal territorial allocation
 Bid rigging

Examples 

 In the example in the picture, the dots in Pc and Q represent competitive industry prices. If firms collude, they can limit production to Q2 and raise the price to P2. Collusion usually involves some form of agreement to seek a higher price.
When companies discriminate, price collusion is less likely, so the discount factor needed to ensure stability must be increased. In such price competition, competitors use delivered pricing to discriminate in space, but this does not mean that firms using delivered pricing to discriminate cannot collude.

Collusion is illegal in the United States, Canada and most of the EU due to antitrust laws, but implicit collusion in the form of price leadership and tacit understandings still takes place. Several examples of collusion in the United States include:

 Market division and price-fixing among manufacturers of heavy electrical equipment in the 1960s, including General Electric.
 An attempt by Major League Baseball owners to restrict players' salaries in the mid-1980s.
 The sharing of potential contract terms by NBA free agents in an effort to help a targeted franchise circumvent the salary cap.
 Price fixing within food manufacturers providing cafeteria food to schools and the military in 1993.
 Market division and output determination of livestock feed additive, called lysine, by companies in the US, Japan and South Korea in 1996, Archer Daniels Midland being the most notable of these.
 Chip dumping in poker or any other card game played for money.
Ben and Jerry's and Häagen-Dazs collusion of products in 2013: Ben and Jerry's makes chunkier flavors with more treats in them, while Häagen-Dazs sticks to smoother flavors.
 Google and Apple against employee poaching, a collusion case in 2015 wherein it was revealed that both companies agreed not to hire employees from one another in order to halt the rise in wages.

In the EU:
 The illegal collusion between the giant German automakers BMW, Daimler and Volkswagen, discovered by the European Commission in 2019, to hinder technological progress in improving the quality of vehicle emissions in order to reduce the cost of production and maximize profits.

There are many ways that implicit collusion tends to develop:

 The practice of stock analyst conference calls and meetings of industry participants almost necessarily results in tremendous amounts of strategic and price transparency. This allows each firm to see how and why every other firm is pricing their products.
 If the practice of the industry causes more complicated pricing, which is hard for the consumer to understand (such as risk-based pricing, hidden taxes and fees in the wireless industry, negotiable pricing), this can cause competition based on price to be meaningless (because it would be too complicated to explain to the customer in a short advertisement). This causes industries to have essentially the same prices and compete on advertising and image, something theoretically as damaging to consumers as normal price fixing.

Barriers 
There can be significant barriers to collusion. In any given industry, these may include:

 The number of firms: As the number of firms in an industry increases, it is more difficult to successfully organize, collude and communicate.
 Cost and demand differences between firms: If costs vary significantly between firms, it may be impossible to establish a price at which to fix output. Firms generally prefer to produce at a level where marginal cost meets marginal revenue, if one firm can produce at a lower cost, it will prefer to produce more units, and would receive a larger share of profits than its partner in the agreement.
Asymmetry of information: Colluding firms may not have all the correct information about all other firms, from a quantitative perspective (firms may not know all other firms' cost and demand conditions) or a qualitative perspective (moral hazard). In either situation, firms may not know each others' preferences or actions, and any discrepancy would incentive at least one actor to renege.
 Cheating: There is considerable incentive to cheat on collusion agreements; although lowering prices might trigger price wars, in the short term the defecting firm may gain considerably. This phenomenon is frequently referred to as "chiseling".
 Potential entry: New firms may enter the industry, establishing a new baseline price and eliminating collusion (though anti-dumping laws and tariffs can prevent foreign companies from entering the market).
 Economic recession: An increase in average total cost or a decrease in revenue provides the incentive to compete with rival firms in order to secure a larger market share and increased demand.
 Anti-collusion legal framework and collusive lawsuit. Many countries with anti-collusion laws outlaw side-payments, which are an indication of collusion as firms pay each other to incentivize the continuation of the collusive relationship, may see less collusion as firms will likely prefer situations where profits are distributed towards themselves rather than the combined venture.

Government Intervention

Collusion often occurs within an oligopoly market structure, which is a type of market failure. Therefore, natural market forces alone may be insufficient to prevent or deter collusion, and government intervention is often necessary.

Fortunately, various forms of government intervention can be taken to reduce collusion among firms and promote natural market competition.

 Fines for companies convicted of collusion.
 Fines and imprisonment for company executives who are personally liable.
 Detect collusion by screening markets for suspicious pricing activity and high profitability.
 Provide immunity to the first company to confess and provide the government with information about the collusion.

See also 
 Conscious parallelism
 Corporate crime

References

General references
 Vives, X. (1999) Oligopoly pricing, MIT Press, Cambridge MA (readable; suitable for advanced undergraduates.)
Tirole, J. (1988) The Theory of Industrial Organization, MIT Press, Cambridge MA  (An organized introduction to industrial organization)
Tirole, J. (1986), "Hierarchies and Bureaucracies", Journal of Law Economics and Organization, vol. 2, pp. 181–214.
Tirole, J. (1992), "Collusion and the Theory of Organizations", Advances in Economic Theory: Proceedings of the Sixth World Congress of the Econometric Society, ed by J.-J. Laffont. Cambridge: Cambridge University Press, vol.2:151-206.

Inline citations

Anti-competitive practices
Game theory
Bidding strategy